Mely Tan Giok Lan (born 11 June 1930), professionally known as Mely G. Tan, is a Chinese Indonesian sociologist. Tan obtained her bachelor's degree from the University of Indonesia, later receiving a scholarship to study at Cornell University. After finishing her doctorate at University of California, Berkeley, Tan returned to Indonesia and wrote extensively on economics and Chinese Indonesians. She is Roman Catholic.

Biography
Tan was born on 11 June 1930 in Jakarta, Indonesia, to a "probably fifth generation" Chinese father and second generation mother; she was the third of five siblings. As a child and teenager, she studied foreign languages, including Dutch, English, French, and German, speaking Dutch with her father and Indonesian with her mother.

Tan studied for her bachelor's degree at the Department of Sinology at the University of Indonesia. In her third year, she entered a scientific writing competition that was organized by the Catholic Scientific Circle, winning the competition with her sociological field study. Tan later wrote that that was one of the factors that interested in studying sociology formally; the contemporary focus on Chinese literature bored her.

When G. William Skinner arrived in Jakarta to study Chinese Indonesians, Tan was chosen as one of his three apprentices. Using the opportunity to study fieldwork and research methodology, Tan spent 18 months in the position. Based on her work with him, Skinner chose Tan to receive the Cornell Southeast Asia Training Fellowship. Tan later graduated from the University of Indonesia in 1959.

In January 1959, Tan arrived in Ithaca, New York, to begin her studies at Cornell University. Despite slight culture shock, Tan enjoyed her studies. She received her Master of Arts in sociology in 1961, with her thesis based on her studies with Skinner. The thesis was later published in 1963 as The Chinese of Sukabumi: A Study in Social and Cultural Accommodation.

After graduation, Tan returned to Jakarta to teach sociology at the Catholic University of Jakarta, later becoming a researcher with the Center for Economic and Social Research of the Indonesian Council of Sciences (ICS, later renamed Indonesian Institute of Sciences) in 1963. The ICS sent her to further her studies at the University of California, Berkeley, in August 1963.

During her studies at Berkeley, Tan participated in sit-ins as part of the Free Speech Movement, only stopping when warned that she could be deported if arrested. Tan took her oral examination with Wolfram Eberhard, Herbert Blumer, Robert Blauner, Neil Smelser, and Daniel Lev as her examiners. After passing, Tan began work on her dissertation.

Tan wrote her dissertation under the guidance of Eberhard, Blauner, and Lev, with approval given on 13 June 1968. Tan became the first Indonesian to receive a PhD in sociology from Berkeley as well as the first female Indonesian with a doctorate in sociology. The dissertation, Social Mobility and Assimilation: The Chinese in the United States, was later published in Taiwan in 1971.

In August 1968, Tan returned to Indonesia. Within a few months, she had become head of a subdivision at the Indonesian Institute of Sciences. In the early 1970s, she became involved in discussions for the economic development of Indonesia. In an article in Tempo, Tan argued for development to use local materials, manufacturers, and equipment.

Afterwards, Tan later took numerous jobs as a lecturer. From 1968 to 1997, Tan taught women’s studies at the University of Indonesia. During the same period, she taught at the Jakarta Police Academy. From 1997 – 2001, Tan became the head of the research department at the Catholic University of Jakarta. She currently works as a lecturer on Police Practices at the University of Indonesia.

Recognition
Tan has received six honorary medals from the government of Indonesia. Atma Jaya University opened the Mely G. Tan reading room in her honour in 2008.

List of awards
 1981: Satyalencana Sistha, for work with the Indonesian Navy
 1982: Satyalencana Dwidya Sistha, for work with the Indonesian National Police
 1989: Satyalencana Karya Satya Level II
 1995: Satyalencana Karya Satya for 30 years of work
 1995: Bintang Jasa Nararya
 2000: Bintang Mahaputera Pratama

Notes

References
 
 

1930 births
Indonesian sociologists
Indonesian Roman Catholics
Indonesian people of Chinese descent
Indonesian Hokkien people
University of Indonesia alumni
Cornell University alumni
University of California, Berkeley alumni
Living people
People from Jakarta
Indonesian women academics